The 2018 League of Ireland First Division season was the 34th season of the League of Ireland First Division. The league began on 23 February 2018 and concluded on 22 September 2018. Contrary to the previous editions, this tournament had 10 teams, which was the largest number since the 2011 season season, and saw the return of the promotion/relegation playoffs.

Overview
The First Division has 10 teams. Each team plays each other three times for a total of 27 matches in the season.

On 22 December 2016, the FAI announced that the league would be restructured into two 10-team divisions from the 2018 season onwards, one of the recommendations made in the 2015 Conroy Report.

Teams

Stadia and locations

Personnel and kits

Note: Flags indicate national team as has been defined under FIFA eligibility rules. Players may hold more than one non-FIFA nationality.

League table

Results

Matches 1–18
Teams played each other twice (once at home, once away).

Matches 19–27
Teams play each other once.

Top scorers

Play-Offs
The second, third and fourth placed First Division teams played off to decide who would play Limerick, the ninth placed team from the Premier Division. The winner of this play off would play in the 2019 Premier Division.
Semi-finals 

2–2 on aggregate. Drogheda United win on penalties.
Finals 

Finn Harps win 3–1 on aggregate.

Relegation-promotion match

Finn Harps won 3–0 on aggregate and were promoted to 2019 Premier Division. Limerick were relegated to the 2019 First Division.

See also
 2018 League of Ireland Premier Division
 2018 League of Ireland Cup

References

 
League of Ireland First Division seasons
2018 League of Ireland
2018 in Republic of Ireland association football leagues
Ireland
Ireland